Zinnia is a genus of annual plant.

Zinnia may also refer to:

 Zinnia, West Virginia, a community in Doddridge County
 HMS Zinnia (K98), a corvette that served in the Royal Navy
 Zinnia, a fictional character in Pokémon Omega Ruby and Alpha Sapphire
 Ethinylestradiol/cyproterone acetate, a birth control pill also known by the brand name "Zinnia"

See also
Xenia (disambiguation)